Dreamland is the first album by singer, songwriter, and guitarist Madeleine Peyroux; it was released in 1996.

Track listing

All tracks arranged by Greg Cohen except 4, 8 and 11.

Personnel
Madeleine Peyroux — vocals, guitar (tracks 4, 8, 9, 12)
Charlie Giordano — organ (1), harmonium (2, 7), accordion (5, 9), harpsichord (3, 10), mellotron (10)
Marc Ribot — electric guitar (1, 3, 10), dobro (2, 6), acoustic guitar (5), banjo (9)
Greg Cohen — double bass (1, 7, 9, 10), bass marimba (3)
Kenny Wollesen — drums (1, 3, 9, 10), percussion (1, 7)
James Carter — tenor saxophone (1, 3), bass clarinet (8)
Marcus Printup — trumpet (2, 7)
Regina Carter — violin (5, 9)
Larry Saltzman — electric guitar (10)
Cyrus Chestnut — piano (4, 8, 11)
Vernon Reid — electric guitar (8)
Steve Kirby — bass guitar (4, 8)
Leon Parker — drums (4), cymbal (8)

Recorded at RPM Studios, New York City, engineered by Michael Krowiak, except tracks 4, 8 & 11 recorded at Unique Studios, NYC, engineered by Michael O'Reilly.

Chart performance
Dreamland debuted at No. 36 on Billboard'''s Heatseekers Album chart on February 8, 1997 and fell to No. 46 the following week.Billboard's Heatseekers Album chart. February 15, 1997. p. 21. Dreamland had no hits and little airplay but sold 200,000 copies worldwide, an impressive total for a jazz album and an unknown singer.
In December 2005, The Observer Music Monthly (OMM)'' ranked the album at number 48 on their list of top 100 albums.
The album is also on Amazon.com's music list of top 100 "Bestsellers in Traditional Jazz & Ragtime" and Amazon UK's music list of top 100 "Bestsellers in Vocal Jazz".

References

1996 debut albums
Madeleine Peyroux albums
Atlantic Records albums